The 25th Filmfare Awards South ceremony honoring the winners of the best of South Indian cinema in 1977 was an event held in 1978.

Awards

Kannada cinema

Malayalam cinema

Tamil cinema

Telugu cinema

Special Awards

References

 Filmfare Magazine 1978.

General

External links
 
 

Filmfare Awards South